Snisha Chandran is an Indian television actress who primarily works in Malayalam and Tamil television.

Career
Snisha made her television debut through the show Neelakkuyil in 2018. She played the lead role of Kasthoori, a tribal girl. The show ran successfully until 2020. She reprised her role in the show's Tamil remake Neelakuyil from 2018 to 2019.

From 2020 to 2022, Snisha played Karthika in Karthika Deepam opposite Vivek Gopan.

In the media 

She was ranked 9th among the Kochi Times Most Desirable Women on Television 2018 by The Times of India.

Filmography

Television

References

External links
 

Living people
21st-century Indian actresses
Actresses in Malayalam television
Actresses in Tamil television
Indian television actresses
Year of birth missing (living people)